Mitrella elianeae is a species of sea snail in the family Columbellidae, the dove snails.

Description
The shell has a length of 10.5 mm.

Distribution
This marine species is found near Madagascar.

References

 Bozzetti L. (2006) Tre nuove Columbellidae (Gastropoda: Hypsogastropoda: Columbellidae: Pyreninae) dal Madagascar Meridionale. Malacologia Mostra Mondiale 53: 6-8

elianeae
Gastropods described in 2006